Brazilian mint can refer to:
 Casa da Moeda do Brasil, which mints the coins of Brazil
 Hyptis crenata, a bushmint shrub